Thrasydoxa is a genus of moths of the family Heliodinidae. There is only one species in this genus: Thrasydoxa tyrocopa Meyrick, 1912 that is found in Colombia.

This species has a wingspan of 17 mm and the type provided from an altitude of 1800 m in San Antonio, Tolima, Colombia.

References

Heliodinidae